Elections to Banbridge District Council were held on 7 June 2001 on the same day as the other Northern Irish local government elections. The election used three district electoral areas to elect a total of 17 councillors.

Election results

Note: "Votes" are the first preference votes.

Districts summary

|- class="unsortable" align="centre"
!rowspan=2 align="left"|Ward
! % 
!Cllrs
! % 
!Cllrs
! %
!Cllrs
! %
!Cllrs
! % 
!Cllrs
!rowspan=2|TotalCllrs
|- class="unsortable" align="center"
!colspan=2 bgcolor="" | UUP
!colspan=2 bgcolor="" | DUP
!colspan=2 bgcolor="" | SDLP
!colspan=2 bgcolor="" | Alliance
!colspan=2 bgcolor="white"| Others
|-
|align="left"|Banbridge Town
|bgcolor="40BFF5"|41.4
|bgcolor="40BFF5"|3
|20.8
|1
|19.9
|0
|6.0
|1
|11.9
|0
|6
|-
|align="left"|Dromore
|bgcolor="40BFF5"|40.4
|bgcolor="40BFF5"|2
|39.3
|2
|19.6
|1
|0.0
|0
|0.7
|0
|5
|-
|align="left"|Knockiveagh
|bgcolor="40BFF5"|31.2
|bgcolor="40BFF5"|2
|24.6
|2
|18.3
|1
|0.0
|0
|25.9
|1
|6
|- class="unsortable" class="sortbottom" style="background:#C9C9C9"
|align="left"| Total
|37.4
|7
|27.7
|5
|19.2
|3
|2.0
|1
|13.7
|1
|17
|-
|}

Districts results

Banbridge Town

1997: 3 x UUP, 1 x DUP, 1 x SDLP, 1 x Independent Nationalist
2001: 3 x UUP, 1 x DUP, 1 x SDLP, 1 x Alliance
1997-2001 Change: Alliance gain from Independent Nationalist

Dromore

1997: 3 x UUP, 1 x DUP, 1 x SDLP
2001: 2 x UUP, 2 x DUP, 1 x SDLP
1997-2001 Change: DUP gain from UUP

Knockiveagh

1997: 3 x UUP, 1 x DUP, 1 x SDLP, 1 x Independent Nationalist
2001: 2 x UUP, 2 x DUP, 1 x SDLP, 1 x Independent
1997-2001 Change: DUP gain from UUP, Independent Nationalist becomes Independent

References

Banbridge District Council elections
Banbridge